Ignatiana may refer to:
 a Syriac version of the Bible
 a variant of the given name Tatyana

Species Latin names
 Ignatiana philippinica, Loureiro, a synonym for Strychnos ignatia, a bean tree native to the Philippines and parts of China
 Amphisbaena ignatiana, Vanzolini, 1991, a worm lizard species in the genus Amphisbaena found in Brazil